Ivan Karabec (born 13 September 1980) is a Czech para table tennis player who competes in international elite events. He is a Paralympic champion, World champion and triple European champion. He was born with undeveloped left arm.

References

1980 births
Living people
Sportspeople from České Budějovice
People from Havířov
Paralympic table tennis players of the Czech Republic
Table tennis players at the 1996 Summer Paralympics
Table tennis players at the 2000 Summer Paralympics
Table tennis players at the 2004 Summer Paralympics
Table tennis players at the 2008 Summer Paralympics
Table tennis players at the 2012 Summer Paralympics
Table tennis players at the 2016 Summer Paralympics
Medalists at the 2000 Summer Paralympics
Czech male table tennis players